Ben Katchor (born November 19, 1951) is an American cartoonist and illustrator best known for the comic strip Julius Knipl, Real Estate Photographer. He has contributed comics and drawings to The Forward, The New Yorker, Metropolis, and weekly newspapers in the United States. A Guggenheim Fellowship and MacArthur Fellowship recipient, Katchor was described by author Michael Chabon as "the creator of the last great American comic strip."

Career

Cartooning
Katchor contributed occasional illustrations while on staff for The Kingsman, the student newspaper of Brooklyn College, and he was an early contributor to RAW. He edited and published two issues of Picture Story, which featured his own work, with articles and stories by Peter Blegvad, Jerry Moriarty, Mark Beyer and Martin Millard.

In 1993, Katchor was the subject of a lengthy profile by Lawrence Weschler in The New Yorker and an extended essay by John Crowley in The Yale Review (1998).

His comics have been translated into French, Italian, German, Spanish and Japanese.

Katchor wrote and illustrated a "weeklong electronic journal" for Slate in 1997, he contributed articles to the now-defunct Civilization: The Magazine of the Library of Congress, did illustrations for the New Yorker and occasionally The New York Times Book Review.

Katchor was the guest editor of the 2017 edition of Best American Comics.

Strips

 Julius Knipl – Paints a fictional version of New York City with a decidedly Jewish/urban sensibility. Julius Knipl has been published in several book collections including Cheap Novelties: The Pleasure of Urban Decay (Penguin), Julius Knipl, Real Estate Photographer: Stories, with a foreword by Michael Chabon (Little, Brown & Co.), and The Beauty Supply District (Pantheon Books).
 The Cardboard Valise – A weekly strip chronicling the travels of Emile Delilah to a variety of imaginary nations. It was expanded, collected and published by Pantheon Books in 2011.
 Hotel & Farm – A weekly strip dealing, over alternating weeks, with hotel culture and agriculture. It appeared in weekly newspapers in the U.S.
 Shoehorn Technique – A weekly strip exploring the possibilities of human mobility across socio-economic strata in an imaginary city. Temporarily suspended after 52-weeks.
 Metropolis series – Since 1998, Katchor has produced a monthly strip for the back-page of Metropolis magazine dealing with the topics of architecture and urban design.  Katchor's operas The Carbon Copy Building and The Slug Bearers of Kayrol Island were adapted from strips in this series. The strips were collected in the 2013 book  Hand-Drying in America and other stories (Pantheon Books). This series ended in December 2016.
 "Our Mental Age" – An online comic-strip series started 2017.
 The Dairy Restaurant (2020), an illustrated history of the dairy restaurant with an online addendum.

Theater
Katchor has written several works of musical theater, including The Rosenbach Company (a tragi-comedy about the life and times of Abe Rosenbach, the preeminent rare-book dealer of the 20th century); The Slug Bearers of Kayrol Island, or, The Friends of Dr. Rushower, an absurdist romance about the chemical emissions and addictive soft-drinks of a ruined tropical factory-island; A Checkroom Romance, about the culture and architecture of coat-checkrooms, and Up From the Stacks, about a page working the stacks of the New York Public Library c.1970.  All feature music by Mark Mulcahy.
In 1999, he collaborated with Bang on a Can on an opera entitled, The Carbon Copy Building.

Teaching
Katchor has been an associate professor at Parsons The New School since 2007.
He gives "illustrated lectures" at colleges and museums accompanied by slide projections of his work. Since 2012 he has run the New York Comics & Picture-story Symposium, a weekly symposium for the study of text-image work.

Awards
Katchor won an Obie Award for his collaboration with Bang on a Can on The Carbon Copy Building, a "comic book opera" based on his writings and drawings that premiered in 1999. The same year, he was the subject of Pleasures of Urban Decay, a documentary by the San Francisco filmmaker Samuel Ball. The first cartoonist to receive a MacArthur Fellowship, Katchor has also received a Guggenheim Fellowship and is a fellow of the American Academy in Berlin.

Bibliography
 Picture Story 2 (editor and contributor) (self-published, 1986)
 Cheap Novelties: The Pleasures of Urban Decay (Penguin, 1991)
 Julius Knipl, Real Estate Photographer: Stories (Little, Brown & Co., 1996)
 The Jew of New York (Pantheon Books, 1998)
 Julius Knipl, Real Estate Photographer: The Beauty Supply District (Pantheon Books, 2000)
 The Cardboard Valise (Pantheon Books, 2011)
 Hand-Drying in America (Pantheon Books, 2013)
 "Conversations: Ben Katchor," edited by Ian Gordon (Univ. Press of Mississippi, 2018)
  The Dairy Restaurant, an illustrated history, March 2020.

References

External links
 
 

1951 births
Alternative cartoonists
American comics writers
American comic strip cartoonists
Jewish comedy and humor
Jewish American writers
Living people
MacArthur Fellows
American opera librettists
People from Brooklyn
Brooklyn College alumni
21st-century American Jews